Apaturopsis cleochares, the painted empress, is a butterfly in the family Nymphalidae. It is found in Guinea, Sierra Leone, Ivory Coast, Ghana, Nigeria, Cameroon, Gabon, Angola, the Central African Republic, the Democratic Republic of the Congo, Sudan, Uganda, Kenya, Tanzania, Malawi, Zimbabwe and Mozambique. The habitat consists of forests and heavy woodland.

Adults are attracted to fermenting bananas, excrement and other decaying matter. They are on wing from September to May.

The larvae possibly feed on Obetia tenax.

Subspecies
Apaturopsis cleochares cleochares (Guinea, Sierra Leone, Ivory Coast, Ghana, southern Nigeria, Cameroon, Gabon, Angola, Central African Republic, Democratic Republic of the Congo, southern Sudan, Uganda, western Kenya, north-western and northern Tanzania)
Apaturopsis cleochares schultzei Schmidt, 1921 (central Kenya, Malawi, eastern Zimbabwe, Mozambique, Tanzania: Usambara Mountains)

References

Butterflies described in 1873
Apaturinae
Butterflies of Africa
Taxa named by William Chapman Hewitson